Antoni Rovira i Virgili (26 November 1882 – 5 December 1949) was a Spanish politician and journalist who was president of Catalonia's Parliament in exile after the Spanish Civil War. His term of office lasted from 1940 to 1949.

In his honour, a university in Catalonia is named after him, the Rovira i Virgili University in Tarragona, with centres also in Reus, Vila-seca, Tortosa and el Vendrell.

He always showed great interest in the Catalan language, as one of his well-known statements shows:

Due to this avid interest in his native language, Rovira i Virgili was fascinated by the great Catalan linguist, Pompeu Fabra and published several articles about him and his work. Rovira i Virgili was fascinated by Fabra's presence and frequently made reference to Fabra's sparkling eyes.

Linguistically, Rovira i Virgili unconditionally adopted and followed Pompeu Fabra's new orthographic and grammatical proposals for the Catalan language at a time when these proposals had not even received institutional support as of yet. Rovira i Virgili was not the only follower of Fabra's proposals to do so, but as he was a reputed journalist, his adherence to Fabra's teachings constituted a notable and representative example of a growing phenomenon during the last decade of the 20th century: the unconditional, direct, instant and complete adherence of certain intellectuals and writers of the time to the theories that Fabra was sustaining, and this in turn established the path for the modernization of the Catalan language and its growing recognition.

Antoni Rovira i Virgili met Pompeu Fabra for the first time personally around the year 1911, when he was writing for a newspaper called El Poble Català. He was already then a great believer in the linguist's thesis, but Fabra had not yet become the unarguable referent of the codification of contemporary Catalan.

At that time there was the belief that the said formal codification of the language would be an easily fulfilled objective due to the recent creation in 1907 of the Institut d'Estudis Catalans. There was, nevertheless, a certain tension among the different existing experts opinions on what the codification should consist of and who should carry out its leadership.

Books translated to English language 
In 2012, the editor "Publicacions URV" (University Rovira i Virgily from Tarragona), published the complete translation of his work "In Defense of Democracy"

References

External links 
Parlament de Catalunya

1882 births
1949 deaths
Politicians from Catalonia